Vicente Pereda Mier (born 18 July 1941) is a Mexican former professional footballer.

Career
Born in Toluca, Pereda began playing youth football for local side River Plate Coyoacán, before joining Deportivo Toluca F.C.'s reserves. He debuted in the Mexican Primera Division with Toluca in 1960, and would score 119 league goals during a 17-year career with the club.

Pereda competed at the 1968 Summer Olympics in Mexico City, where the Mexican team placed fourth.

References

External links

1941 births
Living people
People from Toluca
Mexico international footballers
Olympic footballers of Mexico
Footballers from the State of Mexico
Footballers at the 1968 Summer Olympics
Deportivo Toluca F.C. players
C.F. Monterrey managers
Liga MX players
Pan American Games gold medalists for Mexico
Pan American Games medalists in football
Association football forwards
Footballers at the 1967 Pan American Games
Mexican football managers
Medalists at the 1967 Pan American Games
Mexican footballers